Black & Veatch (BV) is the largest engineering firm in the Kansas City metropolitan area. Founded in 1915 in Kansas City, Missouri it is now headquartered in Overland Park, Kansas It is a global engineering, procurement, construction (EPC) and consulting company specializing in infrastructure development in power, oil and gas, water, telecommunications, government, mining, data centers, smart cities and banking and finance markets.

In 2020, BV was the 7th largest majority employee-owned company in the United States. In 2020, with revenues of $3.7 billion, the company was ranked by Forbes as the 123rd largest privately owned company in the United States. Engineering News-Record, which compiles and publishes rankings of the largest construction and engineering firms annually, measured by gross revenues, ranked BV first in telecommunications, second in power, fifth in water, eighth in wastewater, 13th in international markets, and 15th in the overall top 500 design category, in the United States in 2016.

BV has more than 100 offices worldwide and has executed projects in more than 100 countries on six continents.

History
Founded in 1915, BV provides asset management, construction, consulting, engineering, operations, physical and cybersecurity, procurement, data analytics, sustainability, and program and construction management.

Company timeline
 1915 Ernest Bateman Black and Nathan Thomas Veatch form a partnership called Black & Veatch with 12 employees on the payroll.
 1940 War Department requests that Black & Veatch rebuild Camp Robinson in Little Rock, Arkansas. Other camp projects include Camp Chafee in Ft. Smith, Arkansas, Camp Hale in Pando, Colorado, and other military installations in the Midwest.
 1948 Work begins for the Atomic Energy Commission at Los Alamos, New Mexico.
 1950 N.T. Veatch appointed by President Harry Truman to the President's Water Pollution Control Advisory Board.
 1963 Black & Veatch International is formed.
 1964 Black & Veatch opens its first regional office in Denver, CO to design a 100 million gallon per day water treatment plant by the Denver Water Board of Colorado.
 1967 Black & Veatch wins a contract to produce a 60-megawatt power generating unit for Yanhee Electricity Authority of Thailand, now known as EGAT, Electricity Generating Authority of Thailand.
 1976 Black & Veatch opens new building at 11401 Lamar Avenue in Overland Park, Kansas.
 1985 Black & Veatch acquires Pritchard Corporation.
 1988 Black & Veatch power division introduces a new computer-aided engineering and project management system called POWRTRAK to be more time efficient and capture new business.
 1993 Black & Veatch forms UK-based partnership with UK business Tarmac following the latter's acquisition of the privatised UK government agency PSA Projects in 1992. This was initially called TBV Consult; after the partnership was discontinued, it was renamed Tarmac Professional Services in 1998, and became part of Carillion in 1999.
 1995 Black & Veatch merges with Binnie & Partners.
 1996 Black & Veatch acquires Paterson Candy Ltd., a UK-based water treatment process contractor and expands building at 11401 Lamar Avenue.
 1999 Black & Veatch changes company structure from general partnership to an employee-owned corporation.
 2005 Black & Veatch acquires RJ Rudden Associates, Lukens Energy Group, and Fortegra, a move that doubles the size of its management consulting business.
 2006 Black & Veatch acquires the water business of MJ Gleeson in the UK, more than doubling the size of its existing UK water operations.
 2008 Black & Veatch selected by Eskom to provide project management and engineering services for a 4,800 megawatt power generation facility in South Africa.
 2009 Black & Veatch repurchases 11401 Lamar Avenue office building in Overland Park, Kansas, and establishes the location as the company's World Headquarters.
 2009 Black & Veatch launched the infraManagement Group LLC (www.inframanagementgroup.com), a wholly owned subsidiary to assist asset owners with management of water, wastewater, and power-generating assets.
 2010 Black & Veatch acquired Enspiria Solutions Inc. to expand its scope of smart-grid services.
 2013 Steve Edwards assumes role as Black & Veatch Chairman, President, and CEO.
 2015 Black & Veatch celebrates its 100th Anniversary.
 2018 Black & Veatch and the University of Missouri release a report on the Missouri Hyperloop
 2020 Black & Veatch names Irvin Bishop Jr. as chief information officer
 2021 The Europe and Asian water businesses of Black & Veatch were acquired by RSK Group and renamed Binnies.

Ukraine arm: BTRIC

In 2008, the Defense Threat Reduction Agency (DTRA) awarded BV the first of its Biological Threat Reduction Integrating Contracts (BTRIC). The five-year IDIQ contract has a collective ceiling of $4 billion among the five selected contractors. DTRA awarded BV, as Integrating Contractor, the first BTRIC in Ukraine in 2008, which "is a vital part" of the Cooperative Threat Reduction (CTR) and Biological Threat Reduction (BTR) program of the DTRA. The Implementing (Executive) Agents were three in number: the Ukraine Ministry of Health, Ukraine Academy of Agrarian Sciences and Ukraine State Committee for Veterinary Medicine.

In 2010, BV commissioned Ukraine's first Bio-Safety Level 3 laboratory. This was the first BSL-3 laboratory commissioned for the DTRA. Constructed by Black & Veatch under the "to renovate a decades-old facility into a state-of-the-art diagnostics laboratory that will become the nexus of Ukraine’s biosurveillance network... Ukrainian personnel in molecular diagnostics, biosafety, operations and maintenance, and laboratory management techniques" were trained over three years from 2010 to "provide Ukrainian scientists with the necessary resources to manage the BSL-3 laboratory and the Ukrainian biosurveillance system."

References

Employee-owned companies of the United States
Companies based in Overland Park, Kansas
Companies based in Kansas City, Missouri
Engineering companies of the United States
International engineering consulting firms
Engineering consulting firms of the United States
Consulting firms established in 1915
Construction and civil engineering companies established in 1915
1915 establishments in Missouri
Technology companies established in 1915